This is a list of electoral district results for the 1962 New South Wales state election.

Results by Electoral district

Albury

Armidale

Ashfield−Croydon

Auburn

Balmain

Bankstown

Barwon

Bass Hill 

Bass Hill was a new seat that was notionally a safe Labor seat.

Bathurst

Blacktown 

Blacktown became a notional Labor seat in the redistribution.

Bligh 

 Bligh was a new seat created from the abolished districts of Paddington−Waverley, held by Keith Anderson (Labor) and Woollahra held by Vernon Treatt (Liberal). It was a notionally a marginal Liberal seat.

Bondi

Bulli

Burrinjuck

Burwood

Byron

Canterbury

Casino

Castlereagh

Cessnock

Clarence

Cobar

Collaroy

Concord

Coogee

Cook's River

Cronulla

Drummoyne 

 Drummoyne became a notional Labor seat in the redistribution.

Dubbo

Dulwich Hill

Earlwood

East Hills

Eastwood

Fairfield

Georges River

Gloucester

Gordon 

Stewart Fraser was the sitting  member however he lost pre-selection.

Gosford

Goulburn

Granville

Hamilton

Hartley

Hawkesbury

Hornsby

Hurstville

Illawarra

Kahibah

King

Kirribilli 

 Kirribilli was a new seat that was notionally a safe Liberal seat.

Kogarah

Kurri Kurri

Lake Macquarie

Lakemba

Lane Cove

Lismore 

 The Country Party had won the 1959 election for Lismore by 2 votes, however it was declared void by the Court of Disputed Returns. The resulting by-election was won by Keith Compton (Labor).

Liverpool

Maitland

Manly

Maroubra

Marrickville

Monaro

Mosman

Mudgee

Murray

Murrumbidgee

Nepean

Newcastle

Orange

Oxley

Parramatta

Phillip

Raleigh

Randwick

Redfern

Rockdale

Ryde

South Coast

Sturt

Sutherland

Tamworth

Temora

Tenterfield

The Hills 

 The Hills was a new seat that was notionally a safe Liberal seat. Alfred Dennis was the sitting Liberal member for Blacktown.

Upper Hunter

Vaucluse

Wagga Wagga

Wakehurst 

 Wakehurst was a new seat that was notionally a safe Liberal seat.

Waratah

Wentworthville 

 Wentworthville was a new seat that was notionally a safe Labor seat.

Willoughby

Wollondilly

Wollongong−Kembla

Wyong 

 Wyong was a new seat that was notionally a safe Labor seat.

Young

See also 

 Candidates of the 1962 New South Wales state election
 Members of the New South Wales Legislative Assembly, 1962–1965

Notes

References 

1962